Stéphane Sanseverino (known as Sanseverino; born 9 October 1961, in Ajaccio) is a French singer, guitarist and songwriter of Neapolitan descent.

He is a self-taught guitarist and an admirer of jazz guitarist Django Reinhardt. His music is inspired by Tzigan music.

Discography
Studio albums

Live albums

References

External links 
 
 Biography of Sanséverino on the RFI musique website 

French male singers
French people of Italian descent
Living people
French songwriters
Male songwriters
1961 births